

Kepler-69b is the innermost planet of the Kepler-69 system. It is likely a hot super-Earth or mini-Neptune.

References

Exoplanets discovered in 2013
Transiting exoplanets
Cygnus (constellation)
69b